Michelle Posada is a Venezuelan actress and restaurateur. She is portrayed the character of "Estela" in nine episodes of the telenovela "Bajo el mismo cielo" which aired in the United States on the Telemundo Network from 2015-16. She has also appeared in "Las Caras del Diablo 2" (2014), "El Psiquiatra" (2014), "Escandalos: Todo es real excepto sus nombres" (2015), "La Banda" (2011) and "Ruta 35" (2016).

Career
Posada began acting at 12 and studied in both Venezuela and Miami, where she moved in 2013.

Posada is also a restaurateur. In 2017 she opened a restaurant in Miami dedicated to healthy eating. The restaurant's name is derived from her nickname, "Michi."

Filmography

Television

References

External links

21st-century Venezuelan actresses
Venezuelan telenovela actresses
Actresses from Miami
Businesspeople from Miami
Women restaurateurs
Year of birth missing (living people)
Living people
21st-century American women